Carlos Octavio Ominami Pascual (born 18 June 1950) is a Chilean economist and politician, former parliamentarian and former Chilean Minister of State.

Family 

Due to his Japanese heritage, he remains in contact with his Japanese ancestry, often visiting the Asian country. He personally met Akihito, then-Emperor of Japan, in 2011.

He is married to the journalist and sociologist Manuela Gumucio Rivas, daughter of the former parliamentarian Rafael Agustín Gumucio and ex-wife of the general secretary of the Revolutionary Left Movement (MIR), Miguel Enríquez (1944–1974). His only (adoptive) child is Marco Enríquez-Ominami, the offspring of his ex wife from a previous relationship, whom he adopted as his own son from an early age.

Early career 

He studied in Santiago at the Instituto Nacional and at the Faculty of Economics and Business in the University of Chile. During his student days he joined the Frente de Estudiantes Revolucionarios (FER), remaining a member until 1973.

He was active in the MIR from 1968.  In 1973, following the deposition of President Salvador Allende, he went into exile.  He sought asylum in the Belgian embassy in Chile, then travelled to Brussels and then to Paris, where he took a doctorate in economics at the University of Paris in Nanterre.  He worked as a researcher, between 1975 and 1978 in the Centre d'Etudes Prospectives d'Economie Mathématiques Apliquée à la Planification (CEPREMAP); from 1978 to 1984 in the Centre National de la Recherche Scientifique (CNRS) and in the Institut Français de Recherche pour le Développement en Cooperation.

From 1978 to 1983 he was active in Convergencia Socialista. Then he joined the Chilean Socialist Party (PSC), participating actively in its reconstruction.  He returned to Chile in 1984, working as adviser to the Latin American International Relations programme (RIAL), a branch of the United Nations Economic Commission for Latin America and the Caribbean (CEPAL) and between 1987 and 1989 he helped to set up the Latin American Centre for Economy and International Politics (CLEPI).

Role in the "Concertación" 

After 1985, he began to emerge as one of the best-regarded left-wing economists, and in 1989 became assistant coordinator of the economic programme of the Concertación.

From March 1990 to September 1992 he served as Minister for the Economy under President Patricio Aylwin.  In 1993 he supported the nomination for President by the Concertación of Ricardo Lagos, who was defeated by the Christian Democrat (DC) candidate Eduardo Frei.

The same year he was elected as Senator for Constituency No. 5, in the Valparaíso region, coming top of the poll with 33.31% of the votes. At the end of 2001 he was re-elected, ahead of his DC rival Ignacio Walker.  As Senator he focussed on economic affairs and was chair of the standing committee on Business, and a member of the Public Works, Health, and other committees.

In June 2009 he announced that he was leaving the PSC in order to support his son's presidential ambitions.  Standing as an Independent candidate, he was defeated in the parliamentary elections in December of that year.

In June 2011 he was awarded the Japanese honour "The Order of the Rising Sun" by the Emperor
Akihito in the Imperial Palace in Tokyo.   This was in recognition of his contribution towards improving relations between the two states.

Published works 

 Nationalisations et Internationalisation, with Ch. A. Michalet. La Découverte/Maspero, Paris, 1983. 163 p.
 Le Tiers Monde dans la Crise. La Découverte, París, 1984. 246 p.
 The third industrial revolution (La tercera revolución industrial). G.E.L., Buenos Aires, 1986. 482 p.
 To Change Life (Cambiar la Vida) (co-author). Editorial Melquíades, Santiago de Chile, 1988. 131 p.
 Ripostes a la Crise en Amerique Latine (co-author). L'Harmatan, París, 1988. 189 p.
 The Entry of Chile into international markets (La inserción de Chile en los mercados internacionales), with R. Madrid. Prospel-Cesoc, Santiago de Chile, 1989. 93 p.
 The Challenge of Uncertainty (El desafío de la incertidumbre) (co-author). Editorial Nueva Sociedad, Santiago de Chile, 1988. 206 p.
 Large Strategic Manoeuvres (Grandes maniobras estratégicas). Editorial Nueva Sociedad, Santiago de Chile, 1990. 210 p.
 Political Animals: father-son dialogues (Animales políticos: diálogos filiales), with Marco Enríquez-Ominami. Planeta, Santiago de Chile, 2004.
 The Silenced Debate (2009) (El debate silenciado: un testimonio). LOM, Santiago de Chile, 2009.
 Secrets of the Concertación (Secretos de la Concertación: recuerdos para el futuro). Planeta, Santiago de Chile, 2011. 355 p. Chilean National Congress Library catalogue

References

External links 
 Japanese Embassy in Chile: Decoration for Carlos Ominami
 
 Library of Chilean National Congress
 Interview with Carlos Ominami in the Socialist Gateway
 Display on the Prohumana web page
 Interview in the Argentine newspaper Clarín, 29 May 2005
 Interview, El Mercurio, 18 April 2007
 Interview on Puerto Paralelo webpage
 Interview in El Mercurio about the 2009 elections
 Revue de la Régulation

1950 births
Living people
Politicians from Santiago
Chilean politicians of Japanese descent
Revolutionary Left Movement (Chile) politicians
Socialist Party of Chile politicians
Government ministers of Chile
Members of the Senate of Chile
20th-century Chilean economists
21st-century Chilean economists